Epoja, also known as Opoya, is a Wayana village situated on the Lawa River in French Guiana.

Geography 
Epoja is conjoined with the village of Taluwen and Alawataimë enï and lies clies to the island village of Kulumuli. In the 1990s, a village by the name of Esperance was founded by Wayana migrating from Suriname next to Epoja and Taluwen.

Notes

References 

Indigenous villages in French Guiana
Maripasoula
Villages in French Guiana